Spring Romance is the second EP and fifth studio release from the band Bend Sinister.

Reception

The opening track "Things Will Get Better" was named as #10 on Grant Lawrence's top 10 songs of 2010 on his weekly CBC Radio 3 Podcast. Lawrence describes the track as "a timeless rocker that would be the ultimate season ending dance finale on Glee."

Track listing 
 "Things Will Get Better" - 3:17
 "Change Your Mind" - 3:04
 "The Little Things" - 3:03
 "Don't Let Us Bring You Down" - 2:58
 "Spring Romance" - 3:09

Personnel
 Dan Moxon  - Lead vocals/Piano
 Jason Dana - Drums
 Joel Myers - Bass
 Henry Alcock White - Guitar/Vocals
 Joseph Blood - Guitar/Vocals

Production
 Howard Redekopp - Producer, Engineer, Mixer
Jarett Holmes - Assistant Engineer

References

Bend Sinister (band) EPs
2010 EPs